The 32nd Sarasaviya Awards festival (Sinhala: 32වැනි සරසවිය සම්මාන උළෙල) were held to honor the best films of both 2007 and 2008 from the Sinhala cinema industry on 2 January 2010 at the Bandaranaike Memorial International Conference Hall, Colombo. The ceremony was hosted by Gamini Samarasinghe.

Awards

2007

2008

References

Sarasaviya Awards
Sarasaviya